Sir Thomas Henry Havelock FRS (24 June 1877 – 1 August 1968) was an English applied mathematician, hydrodynamicist and mathematical physicist. He is known for Havelock's law (1907).

Havelock was born in Newcastle-upon-Tyne. At the age of sixteen, he entered Durham College of Physical Science. (Durham College of Physical Science was renamed Armstrong College in 1904.) He matriculated in 1897 at St John's College, Cambridge and graduated there B.A. in 1900 and M.A. in 1904. From 1903 to 1909 he was a Fellow of St John's College, Cambridge. He was a professor of applied mathematics at Armstrong College from 1914 until his retirement in 1945. (In the 1930s Armstrong College became part of King's College, Durham, which in the 1960s became part of Newcastle University.)

Havelock's law
Relationship between the refractive index  and the wavelength  of a homogeneous material that transmits light:
 , where
 = constant for the material at a given temperature
 = Kerr constant of the material (The Kerr constant is approximately proportional to the absolute temperature.)
 = wavelength of the material
 = refractive index of the material

Awards and honours
1914 – F.R.S.
1956 – William Froude Gold Medal of the Royal Institution of Naval Architects
1957 – Knighthood

Selected publications

References

External links
Havelock (Thomas) Archive, Special Collections - University Library - Newcastle University
Havelock Hall, Special Collections – University Library – Newcastle University

1877 births
1968 deaths
20th-century English mathematicians
Alumni of St John's College, Cambridge
Fellows of St John's College, Cambridge
Fellows of the Royal Society
Fluid dynamicists